1-OQA+19 is an album by Muhal Richard Abrams released on the Italian Black Saint label in 1977 which features performances by Abrams, Anthony Braxton, Henry Threadgill, Steve McCall and Leonard Jones.

Reception
The Allmusic review states "The unit made demanding, harmonically dense and rhythmically unpredictable material, with Braxton's scurrying solos ably matched by Threadgill's bluesier lines and Abrams' leadership and inventive blend of jazz, blues, and other sources holding things together". The Penguin Guide to Jazz awarded the album 3 stars stating "Anthony Braxton is one of the certain masters modern jazz and perhaps Abrams's most gifted pupil. The music they make together is complex, scurryingly allusive and seldom directly appealing". The Rolling Stone Jazz Record Guide said "Abrams the small group leader has never sounded better".

Track listing

Recorded in November–December 1977 at Generation Sound Studios, New York City

Personnel
Muhal Richard Abrams: piano, synthesizer, voice
Henry Threadgill: alto saxophone, tenor saxophone, flute, voice
Anthony Braxton: soprano saxophone, alto saxophone, flute, clarinet, voice
Leonard Jones: bass, voice
Steve McCall: drums, percussion, voice

References

1978 albums
Muhal Richard Abrams albums
Black Saint/Soul Note albums